Edward James Morse (born 30 January 1986) is an English former first-class cricketer.

Morse was born at Stevenage in January 1986. While studying at St Edmund Hall, he made his debut in first-class cricket for Oxford UCCE against Lancashire at Oxford in 2005. He played seven further first-class matches for Oxford UCCE, the last coming in 2008. He also played in four University Matches for Oxford University against Cambridge University between 2005–08. With his right-arm fast-medium bowling, he took 29 wickets at an average of 36.37, with best figures of 6 for 102. One of two five wicket hauls he took, these figures came for Oxford University against Cambridge University in 2008. In addition to playing first-class, Morse also played minor counties cricket for Hertfordshire, making two appearances in the Minor Counties Championship in 2004 and 2005.

References

External links

1986 births
Living people
People from Stevenage
Alumni of St Edmund Hall, Oxford
English cricketers
Hertfordshire cricketers
Oxford University cricketers
Oxford MCCU cricketers